Park Sang-wook  (born 30 January 1986) is a South Korean footballer.

He was arrested on the charge connected with the match-fixing scandal on 26 March 2011. On 17 June 2011, his football career was rescinded by the Korea Professional Football League with other accomplices.

References

External links 

1986 births
Living people
Association football midfielders
South Korean footballers
Ulsan Hyundai FC players
Daejeon Hana Citizen FC players
K League 1 players
Sportspeople banned for life